Macna minanga is a species of snout moth in the genus Macna. It was described by Georg Semper in 1899 and is known from Luzon in the Philippines.

References

Moths described in 1899
Pyralini